Marshall Memorial Municipal Airport  is a city-owned, public-use airport located two nautical miles (4 km) south of the central business district of Marshall, a city in Saline County, Missouri, United States. It is included in the National Plan of Integrated Airport Systems for 2011–2015, which categorized it as a general aviation facility.

Facilities and aircraft 
Marshall Memorial Municipal Airport covers an area of 225 acres (91 ha) at an elevation of 779 feet (237 m) above mean sea level. It has two runways: 18/36 is 5,006 by 75 feet (1,526 x 23 m) with an asphalt surface and 9/27 is 3,320 by 150 feet (1,012 x 46 m) with a turf surface.

For the 12-month period ending December 31, 2011, the airport had 5,490 aircraft operations, an average of 15 per day: 93% general aviation, 6% air taxi, and 1% military. At that time there were 24 single-engine aircraft based at this airport.

References

External links 
 Airport page at City of Marshall website
 Marshall Memorial Municipal (MHL) at MoDOT Airport Directory
 Aerial image as of March 1997 from USGS The National Map
 
 

Airports in Missouri
Buildings and structures in Saline County, Missouri